This is the soundtrack to the US horror remake The Uninvited. Its original score was composed by Christopher Young.

Track listing
US edition
 The Uninvited
 Twice Told
 At A Party
 Glass Act
 Bloody Milk
 Christmas Corpse
 Pairs In Love
 Terror in the Water
 Twined Nightmares
 Cry Of Love
 Working Dreams
 The Screaming Bell
 What Have You Done . . .
 A Dance With No One
 Sisters Anyways

References

Film scores
2009 soundtrack albums